Mustapha Fofana (born 10 May 2001) is a professional footballer who plays as a forward for Ørn Horten. Born in Sierra Leone, he represents Norway internationally.

Playing career
Joining Strømsgodset's youth setup in 2016 after tenures in other local teams, he made his senior debut in the 2019 Norwegian Football Cup against Ullern. He signed for the first team in June 2019, and made his league debut in July 2019 against Lillestrøm.

In the closing stages of the 2020 1. divisjon he went on loan to Øygarden FK, having played not a single game for Strømsgodset in 2020. In 2021, a loan at third-tier Bærum was short-lived, and he went on to fourth-tier Ørn Horten.

References

2001 births
Living people
People from Bo, Sierra Leone
Sportspeople from Drammen
Norwegian footballers
Norway youth international footballers
Sierra Leonean emigrants to Norway
Association football forwards
Eliteserien players
Strømsgodset Toppfotball players
Øygarden FK players
Norwegian First Division players
Bærum SK players
FK Ørn-Horten players